Sir Thomas Charlton Meyrick, 1st Baronet  (14 March 1837 – 30 July 1921), known as Thomas Charlton until 1858, was a Welsh Conservative Member of Parliament.

Biography
Born Thomas Charlton, he was the son of St John Chiverton Charlton. He assumed by Royal licence the surname of Meyrick (which was that of his maternal grandfather Thomas Meyrick) in lieu of his patronymic in 1858. He was returned to Parliament for Pembroke in 1868, a seat he held until 1874. In 1880 he was created a Baronet, of Bush House in the Parish of St Mary in the County of Pembroke and of Apley Castle in the parish of Wellington in the County of Salop.

Mayrick served in the army, and became a lieutenant-colonel. After he had retired from the regular army, he was on 19 March 1902 appointed Honorary colonel of the 3rd (Militia) Battalion the King's (Shropshire Light Infantry).

Meyrick was appointed a Companion of the Order of the Bath (CB) in 1898, and was promoted to Knight Commander (KCB) in 1910.

Family
Meyrick married Mary Rhoda (died 1924), daughter of Richard Frederick Hill, in 1860. He died in July 1921, aged 84, and was succeeded in the baronetcy by his eldest son Frederick, himself a major in the army who commanded the first regiment of the Imperial Yeomanry, formed in 1900.

Notes

References
 cites:

 cites:

Further reading

 

1837 births
1921 deaths
Meyrick, Sir Thomas, 1st Baronet
Knights Commander of the Order of the Bath
Members of the Parliament of the United Kingdom for Pembrokeshire constituencies
UK MPs 1868–1874
Conservative Party (UK) MPs for Welsh constituencies
King's Shropshire Light Infantry officers